The Viking 33 is a Canadian sailboat, that was designed by Cuthbertson & Cassian and first built in 1971.

The Viking 33 design was developed into the Viking 34 in 1973. The Viking 34 features a Peterson-style keel, a new interior design and a  taller mast.

Production
The design was built by Ontario Yachts in Canada between 1971 and 1973, but it is now out of production.

Design
The Viking 33 is a small recreational keelboat, built predominantly of fiberglass, with wood trim. It has a masthead sloop rig, a raked stem, a raised reverse transom, an internally-mounted spade-type rudder controlled by a tiller and a fixed swept fin keel. It displaces  and carries  of ballast.

It has  of headroom below decks. The boat came factory-equipped with a  Universal Atomic 4 gasoline engine.

The design has a PHRF racing average handicap of 138 with a high of 141 and low of 138.

Operational history
In a review Michael McGoldrick wrote, "Although the design is getting a little old, the Viking 33 still has to rate as one of the better looking boats on the water. It has sleek lines and a graceful bow. It may be just a touch narrower than the boats that were built in the 1980s, but it still has the appearance of a contemporary yacht. Like the Ontario 32, the Viking was also designed by C&C and built by Ontario Yachts. Unlike the Ontario 32, this boat was designed with racing in mind."

See also

List of sailing boat types

Related development
Viking 34

Similar sailboats
Abbott 33
Alajuela 33
Arco 33
C&C 33
C&C 101
C&C SR 33
Cape Dory 33
Cape Dory 330
CS 33
Endeavour 33
Hans Christian 33
Hunter 33
Hunter 33-2004
Hunter 33.5
Hunter 333
Hunter 336
Hunter 340
Marlow-Hunter 33
Mirage 33
Moorings 335
Nonsuch 33
Tanzer 10
Watkins 33

References

External links

Keelboats
1970s sailboat type designs
Sailing yachts
Sailboat types built by Ontario Yachts
Sailboat type designs by C&C Design